Berthold Karl Adolf von Deimling (21 March 1853, Karlsruhe, Grand Duchy of Baden – 3 February 1944) was a general officer of the German Army during World War I.

Deimling entered the army in 1871, following the Franco-Prussian War, and after working on the General Staff and in German South-West Africa rose to command a brigade of infantry in 1907.  

On the outbreak of the First World War, Deimling was in command of the XV Corps near the Swiss border and commanded them during the Battle of Mulhouse. He would later command forces in the First Battle of Ypres, the Battle of Verdun and the Battle of the Somme.  He was awarded the Pour le Mérite on 28 August 1916.

After the war Deimling became a committed pacifist and a member of the board of directors of the German Peace Society (DFG). He was a member of the German Democratic Party. He died in Baden-Baden.

See also
 Saverne Affair

References

 The Prussian Machine

External links
 
Reinhold Lütgemeier-Davin: Deimling, Berthold von, in: 1914-1918-online. International Encyclopedia of the First World War.

1853 births
1944 deaths
Military personnel from Karlsruhe
People from the Grand Duchy of Baden
Generals of Infantry (Prussia)
German Democratic Party politicians
Reichsbanner Schwarz-Rot-Gold members
German Peace Society members
Recipients of the Pour le Mérite (military class)
Schutztruppe personnel
German Army generals of World War I